{{DISPLAYTITLE:C22H29NO2}}
The molecular formula C22H29NO2 (molar mass: 339.471 g/mol) may refer to:

 A-834,735
 Dextropropoxyphene
 Levopropoxyphene
 Lobelanidine
 Noracymethadol

Molecular formulas